Lysine demethylase 6B is a protein that in humans is encoded by the KDM6B gene.

Regulation during differentiation 
KDM6B was found to be expressional increased during cardiac and endothelial differentiation of murine embryonic stem cells.

Small molecule inhibition 
A small molecule inhibitor (GSK-J1) has been developed to inhibit the jumonji domain of KDM6 histone demethylase family to modulate proinflammatory response in macrophages.

Diagnosis
Standard laboratory exome sequencing can be used to identify the KDM6B gene variant.

Prognosis
A 2019 study on symptoms from KDM6B variations reported:
 Delays in speech and motor development 
 Dysmorphic facial features including coarse features, a prominent forehead, broad mouth, large and prominent ears, a round face, prognathism, and epicanthal fold 
 Musculoskeletal features including some what widened and thickened hands and fingers, joint hypermobility, clinodactyly of the fifth fingers, and toe syndactyly 
 Neuromuscular hypotonia
 Intellectual disability 
 Autism spectrum disorder

Epidemiology
For patients reporting intellectual disability and/or developmental delay, approximately 0.12% have de novo alterations in the KDM6B gene

See also 
Overlapping phenotypic features for patients between KDM6A associated with Kabuki syndrome and KDM6B variations include prominent ears, abnormal dentition, congenital heart disease, feeding difficulties, cryptorchidism, joint hyper-mobility, developmental delay, hypotonia, and behavioral difficulties.

References

Further reading 

 

Human proteins